Robert Nelson (March 1, 1930; San Francisco – January 9, 2012; Laytonville, California) was an American experimental film director.

Archive
The moving image collection of Robert Nelson is housed at the Academy Film Archive. The Academy Film Archive has preserved a number of Robert Nelson's films, including Grateful Dead, The Great Blondino, and Hot Leatherette.

Selected filmography

Building Muir Beach House (1961, with Gunvor Nelson)
Last Week at Oona's Bath (1962, with Gunvor Nelson)
The Mystery of Amelia Air-Heart Solved (1962)
King Ubu (1963)
Plastic Haircut (1963, with William T. Wiley, R.G. Davis, Robert H. Hudson, Steve Reich)
Oh Dem Watermelons (1965)
Confessions of a Black Mother-Succuba (1965)
Oily Peloso the Pumph Man (1965)
Thick Pucker (1965)
Sixty Lazy Dogs (1965)
Half-Open and Lumpy (1967)
Penny Bright and Jimmy Witherspoon (1967)
Superspread (1967)
The Beard (1967)Portrait of Gourley (1967)The Off Handed Jape (1967, with William T. Wiley)Hot Leatherette (1967)The Great Blondino (1967, with William T. Wiley)Grateful Dead (1967)The Awful Backlash (1967, with William Allan)War is Hell (1968, with William Allan)What Do You Talk About? (1969, with William T. Wiley)Bleu Shut (1970)King David (1970/73/2003, with Mike Henderson)R.I.P. (1970/74/2003)No-More (1971, with various students at Cornell University)Worldly Woman (1973, with Mike Henderson)Deep Westurn (1974)Suite California Stops & Passes Part 1: Tijuana to Hollywood Via Death Valley (1976)Suite California Stops & Passes Part 2: San Francisco to the Sierra Nevadas & Back Again (1978)Hamlet Act (1982)Limitations (1988)Curious Native Customs (1989)199 L.la (1989)Hauling Toto Big (1997)Special Warning'' (1998)

See also
Canyon Cinema

References

External links
"Goodbye, Bob" post by Mark Toscano, from Preservation Insanity
Canyoncinema.com
L.A. Weekly article, Jan 17, 2008

1930 births
2012 deaths
American experimental filmmakers
Film producers from California
American male screenwriters
American cinematographers
People from Laytonville, California
Film directors from California
Screenwriters from California